Adriano Zanaga (14 January 1896 – 31 January 1977) was an Italian racing cyclist. He won stage 4 of the 1924 Giro d'Italia. In 1922 and 1925 he won Milano–Torino.

References

External links
 

1896 births
1977 deaths
Italian male cyclists
Italian Giro d'Italia stage winners
Sportspeople from Padua
Cyclists from the Province of Padua